Gavin Ward is one of the two founding members of the now disbanded Bolt Thrower. He started out as the bass player early on in the band in 1986, and so can be heard on the first demo. For the second demo, he switched to playing lead and rhythm guitar. He plays lead and rhythm guitar on all albums, save Mercenary and Honour - Valour - Pride; there he plays solely rhythm guitar. Ward was also one of the lyricists of the band. Bolt Thrower disbanded in 2016, a year after the death of their drummer Martin Kearns.

Before Ward started with Bolt Thrower he helped out the punk band The Varukers on one of their tours - the band later joined them on a European tour.

He is from Leamington Spa, England.

Equipment
 BC Rich Virgin/Beast
 Boss GX700
 Marshall 9040 200w power amp
 4 x Marshall 4x12

References

English heavy metal guitarists
Bolt Thrower members
Living people
People from Leamington Spa
Year of birth missing (living people)